Kid Nation is a CBS reality show based around a society essentially run by kids. The cast included 40 children aged from 8 to 15 years old, and from a variety of ethnic backgrounds, cultures and religions.

Alex 

Alexander "Alex" Wade was a 9-year-old blue district member from Reno, Nevada. He won a gold star on day 37 in episode 12. He was shown to have great intelligence in many episodes, often offering a fact or two to his companions that they did not previously know. Alex is a three-time Nevada geography champion, and represented Nevada in the 2008, 2009, and 2010 National Geographic Bee (previously called the National Geographic Geography Bee).
Alex is also an International Linguistics Olympiad medalist, having earned a silver medal in 2011 and a gold in 2012. He graduated from Stanford University and now works at Atlassian.

Anjay 

Anjay Ajodha was a 12-year-old from Pearland, Texas. He was introduced in episode one as a council leader (of the blue district), and remained on the council until the second election in episode 10 when he was replaced by Greg in a 2–7 vote.

He has won multiple spelling bees. He was the youngest kid to ever compete in the Scripps Howard National Spelling Bee, at age 8, in 2003, and placed 18th overall in the National Spelling Bee in 2006. When he was seven years old, he was judged "the best young speller in the Senior Spelling Bee category". Anjay was homeschooled until the third grade and has remained an accelerated student since. He became an Eagle Scout in 2011. He graduated from the Honors College at the University of Houston in 2015 with a degree in computer science. He now works at Docusign in Seattle, Washington.

He has been a commentator for the Houston Public Media Spelling Bee for several years, along with host Ernie Manouse.

Blaine 

Blaine Wise was a 14-year-old from North Palm Beach, Florida. He is not related to Sophia Wise despite sharing the last name. Blaine was originally assigned to the blue district and became close friends with Greg. In the ninth episode, Blaine was transferred to the yellow district, where he was able to excel outside of Greg's shadow of influence. He promptly won a gold star in episode 9 for his performance and ability to motivate his new team. In the tenth episode, Blaine was elected to the town council, narrowly defeating incumbent Zach (5-4) who had brought him into the yellow team.

Brett 

Brett Norstom was an 11-year-old yellow district member from Edina, Minnesota.

Campbell 

Campbell Beadles was a 10-year-old green district member from Thomasville, Georgia. He was quite upset after his friend Cody left on the 13th day.

Cody 

Cody Mendenhall was a 9-year-old yellow district member from Newport, Ohio. He left the series on day 13 in episode 4, due to homesickness.

Colton 

Colton Blake was an 11-year-old yellow district member from Reno, Nevada. He helped the yellow team finish in first place for the first time.

Divad 

Divad Miles was an 11-year-old red district member from Fayetteville, Georgia. She was known as the "potato girl" throughout the show for her dedication to cooking potatoes for the town. She also made numerous appeals to the town council and her fellow townsfolk to be nominated for the gold star, though she never received it.

DK 

Daniel "DK" Kyri (born October 10, 1992) was a 14-year-old red district member from Chicago, Illinois. He won a gold star in the sixth episode for his hard work and ability to solve conflicts involving other kids. He came very close to not winning the gold star, however, as he volunteered to leave just before the announcement because he had grown tired of all the constant bickering; Guylan convinced him to stay and he was awarded the gold star. He replaced Guylan as a town council member during the second election without contest. He is also the only member of the red district to win a gold star.

He is a writer and actor, recently appearing in a recurring role in Chicago Fire, Hamlet at The Gift Theatre in Chicago, Objects in the Mirror at Goodman Theatre, and Monster at Steppenwolf Theatre Company.

Emilie 

Emilie was a 9-year-old red district member from Nevada. She had very strong opinions about whether or not to kill the chickens for food, as the Pioneer's Journal told them to do. They eventually killed the chicken anyway, with many objections from Emilie. She got traded to the blue district from the red district in episode 9 because Anjay felt that she didn't work hard in the red district and didn't like her red district mates.

Eric 

Eric Sturm was a 14-year-old green district member from Morristown, New Jersey. In the talent show, he played the piano and sang Leaving New Jersey, an original composition. He was also friends with Zach who was on the yellow district, Hunter and Michael who were also in the green district. He enjoys playing piano, guitar, bass, and singing.

Gianna 

Gianna Clark was a 10-year-old blue district member from Chicago, Illinois. She was naturally quiet, and was seen speaking only twice on the show. She was well liked by her teammates because she was friendly and was a dependable, hard worker. After graduating from Stanford University, Gianna moved back to Chicago for a few years but she has relocated to Los Angeles.

Greg 

Gregory Pheasant was a 15-year-old blue district member from Reno, Nevada, and the oldest participant on the show. He was the oldest and strongest kid in the town. Often temperamental and, at times, he even seemed to bully and tease his counterparts, which he referred to as "tough love." A hard worker, Greg was nominated for gold stars in three of the first four episodes, but was voted against because of Mike's suspicions about Greg's motivations. Depicted as very bossy and bullying to the younger children who became fearful of him, Greg won a gold star in episode 5 for being a genuinely hard worker, improving his attitude, and for comforting some of the younger participants who were dealing with homesickness. In the tenth episode, Greg was elected to the town council for the blue district, defeating Anjay 7–2.

Guylan 

Guylan Qudsieh was an 11-year-old red district member from Upton, Massachusetts. He became a member of the town council at the first elections on day 16 (episode 5), taking Mike's place as leader of the red district. He was overwhelmed with the responsibilities and criticized that as a leader he had to endure and at the second election on day 29 (episode 10), he asked the town to vote him off.

Hunter 

Hunter Jeffers was a 12-year-old boy and was a green district member from Martinez, Georgia. He received a gold star on day 34 in episode 11 for his hard work. Hunter was also shown leading some of the town in prayer.

Jared 

Jared Goldman was an 11-year-old red district member from Dunwoody, Georgia. He was shown to be quite intelligent and was known for making quirky quotations that didn't always fit the situation such as "Holy Banana Bread!" and "Pelvis has left the building baby!". After the show had aired, Jared sold several leftover "Bonanza 2007" necklaces on eBay. During the Kid Nation talent show, he recited a passage from Shakespeare, which he had practiced earlier by reading to the chickens. He expressed satisfaction that his performance "wasn't the worst one." He was close winning the gold star in episode 12 day 37 but lost to Alex. During the first dinner, he approached one of the leaders and states that "Today has been the worst day in three years." This comment was met with questions from viewers as to what happened to the poor lad three years prior to that day.

Jasmine 

Jasmine Robinson was an 11-year-old red district member from Atlanta, Georgia. She is the subject of a confessional-style interview and sang during episode 8.

Jasmine started acting and singing at the age of 4. She landed her first commercial with Volvo. Although they did not have a part for a 4-year-old after she auditioned they wrote her in. She has been in the Toys R US, Christmas, Thanksgiving, Back to School, Halloween and Valentine commercials. She is in the movie The Gospel. She was the co-host for a TV Show called The Fun Farm on The Black Family Channel (BFC Kids TV). She is also co-hosting a radio show at 97.9 WIBB Clear Channel in Macon, Georgia along with her brother. Jasmine is also working on a singing career. As a singer, she is known as QT Jazz of the group QT Possie.

Jimmy 

James "Jimmy" Flynn (born 1998) was an 8-year-old green district member from Salem, New Hampshire. He was the youngest participant, and left the show in the first episode on day 4 due to homesickness.

He made an appearance in a JonTron YouTube video at the age of 21, where he was interviewed about his experience on Kid Nation. During the interview, he noted he would be attending medical school in the near future, with intent to become an oncologist.

Kelsey 

Kelsey Liu was an 11-year-old yellow district member from Furlong, Pennsylvania, a small town east of Doylestown. She made friends easily with the other yellow team girls. She appeared in every episode and also in several publicity interviews for the show since filming was complete. Kelsey is a talented pianist, as seen in the talent show segment of episode 8, Starved for Entertainment. She is also best friends with Leila, Taylor, Randi and Sophie, her fellow district members. Kelsey also modeled for a summer camp magazine after attending the camp.

Kennedy 

Kennedy Peyton Womack was a 12-year-old green district member from Ashland, Kentucky. She was awarded a gold star on day 25 (episode 8) for her hard work, social demeanor, and outgoing personality, and also for convincing Savannah to stay with the community in spite of homesickness. Kennedy is a very gifted poet, and is also a nationally ranked tennis player in her age group.

Laurel 
Laurel McGoff (born January 12, 1995) was a 12-year-old green district member from Medford, Massachusetts. Laurel was appointed to the first town council and was re-elected in the first election. She was defeated by Michael in the second election on day 29 (6-3) (episode 10). She subsequently received a gold star on day 31 for her work on the council and as an effective overall leader for the entire town. In Kid Nation she appeared significantly in every episode as well as publicity interviews for the show after filming. She also appeared at a younger age on the PBS Kids Go! show, Fetch! with Ruff Ruffman in episodes "B.L.T. for Breakfast?" and "Tryin' Chef" because her elder brother, Brian, was a contestant on the show. She did not participate in the talent show, but at the town meeting later that episode, she was convinced to sing "Amazing Grace" after being prompted by D.K. In June 2020, McGoff released a YouTube video in which she discussed her experience on the show.

Leila 

Leila Mallouky was a 9-year-old yellow district member from Charlotte, North Carolina.

Madison 

Madison Rae Taff was an 11-year-old red district member from El Paso, Texas. She is an avid guitar player. Though a hard worker on the show, she was quiet and was seen speaking only three times on the show.

Maggie 

Margaret "Maggie" Levie was a 14-year-old red district member from Evansville, Minnesota.

Maggie attended Evansville Public School until 8th grade where she started homeschooling. She was home-schooled in Minnesota. Maggie has done various amounts of theater work and has a passion for music. She recorded her first demo CD at Pachyderm Studios in Cannon Falls, Minnesota. Her mother, Patty Kakac, is a singer-songwriter and introduced Maggie to the performing arts when she was very young.

Mallory 

Mallory Cloer was an 8-year-old blue district member from Indianapolis, Indiana. She won a gold star on her 9th birthday (day 10) in the third episode. She is Olivia's younger sister. Both Mallory and her sister, Olivia did interviews for Radio Disney and several other radio stations.

Markelle 

Markelle Gay (born September 24, 1994, in Chesapeake, Virginia) was a 12-year-old red district member from the East Cobb area of Marietta, Georgia. While interviewing in NY after Kid Nation, he landed a spot on the KidzBop World Tour, along with 5 other kids from around the nation and a full band. He has toured in professional productions of Broadway's Beauty and the Beast and The Music Man, as well as commercials and industrials for McDonald's, Country Crock, Ford Motor Company, and Cartoon Network. He appears in the 20th Century Fox film Dirty Laundry, playing the young Eugene. Markelle has continued his Broadway aspirations since Kid Nation and became a member of Actors' Equity Association, the esteemed performing arts union. He was admitted to Walnut Hill School for the Performing Arts in 2011 and booked a recurring co-starring role in the Cue Box on Studio 252 TV. Markelle studied at the Savannah College of Art and Design in Savannah, Georgia and is a drama major at Morehouse College in Atlanta. In 2017, Markelle was cast as a principal role, Darius, in the 2017 Kenny Leon directed musical Holler if Ya Hear Me.

Michael 

Michael Thot was a 14-year-old green district member from Sultan, Washington. Michael was awarded a gold star on day 7 for his motivational speaking and rationality (episode 2), and was elected to the town council in the second election on day 29 (episode 10), replacing Laurel. He turned 15 years old during episode 11.

He later recounted his experience with the show in an interview with Cracked.com, and answered questions about the production on the r/IAmA Reddit forum.

Miglė
Miglė Drąsutavičiutė was a 13-year-old blue district member from Downers Grove, Illinois. Miglė won a special gold star at the conclusion of the final episode, having been selected as the most improved participant.

Miglė (pronounced "ME-glay") immigrated to America from Lithuania. She is an aspiring actress and is represented by Charlie's Talent Agency. She performs under two stage names "Otilija Venckus", which is her mother's last name, and "Meglea Drasa".

Mike 

Michael Klinge was an 11-year-old red district member from Bellevue, Washington. He was introduced in episode one as a town council member. He was replaced by Guylan during the first election on Day 16 (episode 5) in a 1–9 vote.

Mike has competed in orienteering through the Washington Interscholastic Orienteering League and Cascade Orienteering Club. In November 2007, Mike was cast as Louis Leonowens in Village Theater's Production of The King And I. Prior to that, Mike understudied the role of Randolph in the previous season's Bye Bye Birdie. Mike's past Village Theatre Kidstage roles include JoJo in Seussical and Gavroche in Les Misérables.

Morgan 

Morgan Wood was a 12-year-old green district member from Indianapolis, Indiana. She was one of only two participants to receive two gold stars. The first was a $20,000 gold star awarded on day 13 (episode 4) for successfully establishing a no-pressure time of spirituality and prayer for the kids. The second was a $50,000 gold star awarded at the conclusion of the series for her positive helpful attitude and for working hard to unify the community.

In 2019, Morgan performed in the Puerto Rico tour of the musical Hamilton, for which she had been a member of the ensemble and an understudy in US tours.

Natasha 

Natasha Goenaga was a 13-year-old blue district member from Miami, Florida. Natasha was friends with Migle. Natasha has been acting and modeling since age 7, she is currently represented by Stellar Talent and Wilhelmina Models. She has done commercials in both English and Spanish for Publix, Coca-Cola, Toys R Us, Miami Children's Hospital and several clothing catalogs. She is also a dancer and was a hip hop dancer for Pop Starz kids production. Natasha was in the gifted program at her middle school.

Nathan 

Nathan Gibes was an 11-year-old boy from Mount Prospect, Illinois. He received a gold star in episode 7 for his hard work and dedication, even having to be told to relax on occasion by council members. In episode 9, he was drafted from the blue district to the red district because Guylan felt his team was lacking hard and smarter workers.

Olivia 

Olivia Cloer was a 12-year-old blue district member from Indianapolis, Indiana. She ran for district council against Anjay in the first election on day 16 (episode 5), but lost with 3 votes to 7. She appeared to carry a grudge against Anjay after this, often picking on him, but reportedly, apologizing afterward. She is Mallory's older sister. Olivia came close to getting a gold star in (episode 8) and was praised highly for her stand-up comedy act in the talent show.

Olivia released a book in 2020 entitled Stronger Than You Think in which she describes her experiences on the show.

Pharaoh 

Pharaoh Williams was a 12-year-old yellow district member from Philadelphia, Pennsylvania. He came close to winning the gold star in episode 7 but lost to Nathan.

Randi 

Randi Buchanan was 11 but turned 12 in an unknown episode. She was a yellow district member from Sparks, Nevada. She left the show on day 28 during episode 9 after becoming homesick.

Savannah 

Savannah Sergent was a 10-year-old green district member from Partridge, Kentucky, a small town northeast of Cumberland. She considered leaving the show due to homesickness during episode 8, but was persuaded to stay by Kennedy who was subsequently awarded a gold star. Savannah has mentioned some of her experiences in TikTok videos.

Sophia 

Sophia Wise was a 14-year-old green district member from Winter Park, Florida. She is not related to fellow contestant Blaine Wise, despite sharing a last name and home state. She was one of only two participants to win two gold stars. The first was a $20,000 gold star won on day four in episode 1 for her work ethic in running the kitchen. Then in the final episode, Sophia was awarded the first of three bonus $50,000 gold star, for her consistency in her hard work. In episode 11 she was appointed town sheriff to help with enforcement of rules, as certain kids continued to shirk their duties to the town. On May 20, 2020, Wise posted a video on her YouTube channel answering questions of her experience on the show.

Sophie 

Sophie Mittelstaedt was a 10-year-old yellow district member from Issaquah, Washington. She is a very talented writer and soccer player. She and Mallory became extremely close friends, and collaborated in running a free "daycare" for stuffed animals in Bonanza City.

Taylor 
Taylor DuPriest (born April 22, 1996, in Albany, Georgia) was a 10-year-old yellow district member from Sylvester, Georgia. Taylor began the show as a town council member, but was removed from the council during the first election, when she was replaced by Zach with a 4–5 vote. Her catchphrase on Kid Nation was "Deal with it!" Taylor was infamous for being incredibly lazy and defiant from the beginning to the end of the show, once stating that "beauty queens don't do dishes." Even as a council member, Taylor encouraged fellow district mates not to participate in chores through example and lack of leadership.

Taylor has entered and won a number of beauty pageants. Winning Miss Georgia Sweetheart 2005, Hall of Fame winner at the Junior Miss Georgia Forestry pageant, 4th Runner-Up 2006 National Sweetheart Miss American Coed Pageant (as well as 3rd Runner-Up Model), and an online store's model search. She has done several prints and appeared on Disney Channel's Show Your Stuff.

In an Entertainment Weekly article on a number of different controversial reality show participants, Taylor revealed that one of her most outrageous lines, "Ugly chickens DESERVE to die" was fed to her by the producers.

She was at school for Occupational Therapy in St. Augustine, Florida until graduating in April 2020.

Zach 

Zachary "Zach" Kosnitzky was a 10-year-old yellow district member from Miami Beach, Florida. He was nominated for a gold star in episode 4 for his hard work and dedication, but lost to Morgan. Zach became a council member after the first election on day 16 (episode 5) when he narrowly defeated Taylor by a margin of 5–4. Zach arranged to obtain Blaine from the blue team in episode 9 in order to gain some strength in the challenges because his team had the youngest participants. He was subsequently defeated by Blaine by a margin of 4–5 in the second election in episode 10. He finally received a gold star in the last episode for his hard work and attitude toward making Bonanza City a better place.

After Kid Nation, Zach played the role of Lewis in Beethoven's Big Break, the sixth installment of the Beethoven film series.

References 

Kid Nation